Tindivanam railway station is a railway station serving Tindivanam, a city and taluk headquarters in Viluppuram district, Tamil Nadu. It is a station on the South line of the Chennai Suburban Railway and comes under the Chennai railway division of the Southern Railway zone. The station code is TMV.

Location and layout
The station is situated on the NH47 or the GST Road which is the main thoroughfare linking state capital Chennai with central and south Tamil Nadu.

The railway station has two platforms. The station is located on the Viluppuram–Chennai line and all trains travelling from Chennai Egmore to central and southern Tamil Nadu will have to pass through the station.

References

Chennai railway division
Railway stations in Viluppuram district